Eastern Syrmia may refer to:

 in geography, eastern parts of the region of Syrmia
 in early modern history, eastern parts of the Syrmia County
 during the Ottoman rule, eastern parts of the Sanjak of Syrmia
 in modern history, eastern parts of the Syrmia Oblast
 in administration, colloquial term for the Syrmia District in Serbia

See also
 Syrmia (disambiguation)
 Western Syrmia (disambiguation)

Syrmia